Anthidiellum perplexum is a species of bee in the family Megachilidae.

Etymology 
The specific epithet perplexum means "perplexing" in Latin."

References

Further reading

External links

 

Megachilidae
Articles created by Qbugbot
Insects described in 1854